The Czech Junior Curling Championships are the national championships of men's and women's junior curling teams in the Czech Republic. Junior level curlers must be under the age of 21. The championships have been held annually since 1992. The championships are organized by the Czech Curling Association.

Champions and medallists
Team line-ups shows in order: fourth, third, second, lead, alternate, coach; skips marked bold.

Junior men

Junior women

References

See also
Czech Men's Curling Championship
Czech Women's Curling Championship
Czech Mixed Curling Championship
Czech Mixed Doubles Curling Championship

Curling competitions in the Czech Republic
Curling
Recurring sporting events established in 1992
1992 establishments in Czechoslovakia
Annual sporting events in the Czech Republic
National curling championships
Youth sport in the Czech Republic
National youth sports competitions
Youth curling